Woolwine is a surname. Notable people with the surname include:

Clare Woolwine (1888–1939), American politician
Emmons H. Woolwine (1899–1951), American architect
Thomas L. Woolwine (1874–1925), American lawyer and politician

See also
Woolwine, Virginia